Camps-la-Source is a commune in the Var department in the Provence-Alpes-Côte d'Azur region in southeastern France.

Twin towns — sister cities
Camps-la-Source is twinned with San Biagio della Cima, Italy (2005).

See also
Communes of the Var department

References

External links

Official site

Communes of Var (department)